Statistics of Emperor's Cup in the 1928 season.

Overview
It was contested by 7 teams, and Waseda University WMW won the championship.

Results

Quarterfinals
Imperial University of Kyoto 8–0 Jintsu Secondary School
Keio BRB 2–1 Hiroshima Koto-shihan
Nagoya Technical College 0–2 Waseda University WMW

Semifinals
Imperial University of Kyoto 5–0 Imperial University of Tohoku
Keio BRB 1–5 Waseda University WMW

Final

Imperial University of Kyoto 1–6 Waseda University WMW
Waseda University WMW won the championship.

References
 NHK

Emperor's Cup
1928 in Japanese football